Michael Lee Lockhart (September 30, 1960 – December 9, 1997) was an American serial killer who received death sentences in three states (Florida, Indiana, and Texas). He was executed on December 9, 1997, by the state of Texas.

Arrest and Convictions
Lockhart was caught when officer Paul Hulsey Jr. tried to arrest him for driving a stolen Chevrolet Corvette in Beaumont, Texas. Officers responding to the motel room where he was reported found Hulsey dead in the room. They put out an all-points bulletin for the vehicle, which was spotted. A high speed chase ensued before Lockhart crashed and was soon apprehended. Evidence of his other crimes was found in the vehicle. Lockhart was convicted of killing officer Hulsey and was sentenced to death. 

He was later convicted in Indiana for the murder of 16-year-old Windy Gallagher in Griffith, Indiana. Following the previous conviction, he pleaded guilty to the murder of 14-year-old Jennifer Colhouer in Land O' Lakes, Florida. He received death sentences in both states. Lockhart was a suspect in the murder of Kathy Hobbs, a 16-year-old girl abducted from Las Vegas, Nevada in 1987. Before its resolution, her case was featured on Unsolved Mysteries in 1989.

Execution
Lockhart was executed on December 9, 1997, in Texas. His last meal consisted of a double-meat cheeseburger, French fries, and Coca-Cola. Lockhart's last words were; "a lot of people view what is happening here as evil, but I want you to know that I found love and compassion here. The people who work here, I thank them for the kindness they have shown me and I deeply appreciate all that has been done for me by the people who work here. That’s all, Warden. I’m ready."

He is buried at Captain Joe Byrd Cemetery.

See also 
 Capital punishment in Texas
 Capital punishment in the United States
 List of people executed in Texas, 1990–1999
 List of serial killers in the United States

References

1960 births
1997 deaths
20th-century executions by Texas
American murderers of children
American rapists
Executed American serial killers
Executed people from Ohio
Male serial killers
People convicted of murder by Florida
People convicted of murder by Indiana
People convicted of murder by Texas
Prisoners sentenced to death by Florida
Prisoners sentenced to death by Indiana
People from Wood County, Ohio
People executed by Texas by lethal injection